John Gurdon Rebow (1799 - 11 October 1870) was an English Liberal Party politician who sat in the House of Commons in two periods between 1857 and 1870.

Rebow was born as "Gurdon" the son of Theophilus Thornhaugh Gurdon of Letton, Norfolk and his wife Anne Mellish, daughter of William Mellish MP. He was educated at Eton College. On his marriage in 1835 he adopted the additional name of Rebow. He was a Deputy Lieutenant and J.P for Essex, as well as being a founding member of the Essex Archaeological Society.

At the 1847 general election, Rebow stood unsuccessfully for parliament at North Essex. He was High Sheriff of Essex in 1853 and was also High Steward of Colchester. In February 1857 he was elected at a by-election as a Member of Parliament (MP) for Colchester. He was re-elected at the general election in March 1857 but was defeated at the 1859 general election. At the 1865 general election he was re-elected for Colchester, and held until his death in 1870.

Rebow died at the age of 71.

Rebow married firstly in 1835 Mary Ormsby, daughter of General Slater Rebow of Wivenhoe Park, and widow of Sir Thomas Ormsby, 3rd Baronet. He married secondly in 1845 Lady Georgina Graham-Toler, daughter of the 2nd Hector John Graham-Toler, 2nd Earl of Norbury.

References

External links
 

1799 births
1870 deaths
People educated at Eton College
Liberal Party (UK) MPs for English constituencies
UK MPs 1852–1857
UK MPs 1857–1859
UK MPs 1865–1868
UK MPs 1868–1874
Deputy Lieutenants of Essex
High Sheriffs of Essex